Thomas Innes may refer to:

Thomas Innes (historian) (1662–1744), Scottish Roman Catholic priest and historian
Thomas Innes of Learney (1893–1971), Lord Lyon